Antonio Blázquez y Delgado-Aguilera (1859 – February 14, 1950) was a Spanish geographer, historian and bibliographer.

References

1859 births
1950 deaths
Spanish geographers
20th-century Spanish historians
19th-century Spanish historians